The Union of South Africa competed at the 1932 Summer Olympics in Los Angeles, United States.

References
Official Olympic Reports
International Olympic Committee results database

Nations at the 1932 Summer Olympics
1932
1932 in South African sport